Expedition Robinson 2000, was the fourth edition of Expedition Robinson, or Survivor as it is referred to in some countries, to air in Sweden and it aired in 2000. For the first time since season one when a tribe lost an immunity challenge it was up to that tribe to vote out one of their members.

The first twist of the season came about when the men and women competed in separate competitions to determine who would select tribes. Roxana and Edward won the challenges and the right to select their tribes. Another major twist this season occurred when two contestants known as 'wildcards' entered the game following the merge. The two wildcard contestants were Anne Hausmanis and Håkan Marklund. Because of Adnan's ejection from the game, Buba was allowed back into the game. Thanks to a little help from the wildcard contestants, the South Team's alliance was able to make it all the way to final four. Mattias Dalerstedt eventually won the season with a jury vote of 7–2 over Edward Lundberg. As there were only eight jury members, the ninth vote was cast by the public. The public voted for Edward.

Finishing order

The game

Voting history

 As Adnan was ejected from the game Arthur and Buba took part in a duel just prior to the merge in order to see who would return to the game and take his place.
 As a twist this season, the first five people voted out of the Robinson tribe would have a vote at the tribal council after their elimination.
 As reward for winning the immunity challenge, Anne was allowed to vote twice at the ninth tribal council.
 The public was allowed to award a jury vote to one of the finalists.

References
Footnotes

Sources

External links
https://web.archive.org/web/20001109075400/http://www.svt.se/noje/robinson/
Expedition: Robinson i SVT 1997-2003
http://wwwc.aftonbladet.se/tv/0010/03/syd2.html
http://wwwc.aftonbladet.se/tv/0010/03/nord.html

 2000
2000 Swedish television seasons